Zetland may refer to:

Places
 Zetland, New South Wales, a suburb of Sydney, Australia
 An archaic spelling of Shetland

Other
 Marquess of Zetland, a title in the British Peerage
 Zetland (lifeboat), oldest surviving lifeboat in the world
 HMS Zetland (L59), British Royal Navy ship
 Zetland (company), Danish news and media company
 The Zetland, hotel in Middlesbrough
 A type of zebroid that is a hybrid cross between a male zebra and a female Shetland pony

See also